Jiránek (feminine Jiránková) is a Czech surname. Notable people with the surname include:

 Antonín Jiránek, Czech violinist and composer
 František Jiránek (1698–1778), Czech (Bohemian) Baroque composer
 Martin Jiránek (b. 1969), Canadian ice hockey player
 Martin Jiránek (b. 1979), Czech footballer
 Vladimír Jiránek (1938–2012), Czech illustrator

See also
17694 Jiránek, main-belt asteroid

Jiránek